In music, Op. 113 stands for Opus number 113. Compositions that are assigned this number include:

 Arnold – Symphony No. 7
 Beethoven – The Ruins of Athens
 Schumann – Märchenbilder
 Shostakovich – Symphony No. 13